Urunga is a small town located within the Mid North Coast region of New South Wales, Australia, in Bellingen Shire. It is famous for its surf spots (reefs, beaches and mouth of two rivers). The town is south of Coffs Harbour and Sawtell and north of Nambucca Heads. The place name, Urunga (pronounced Yoo-run-ga), is derived from the Gumbaynggir word  Yurūnga (pronounced Yu-roon-ga), which is derived from the word for long yurūn in reference to "long white sands".

Geography
There are two main streets, and both a bowling club and a golf club. A weekly 6-a-side soccer competition is held on Thursdays at the Oval on Morgo Street, colloquially known as the Cabbage Patch or simply 'The Patch'.

History
Urunga is a fishing ground, with bream being the main sport fish. The Urunga boardwalk, leading over the tidal Urunga Lagoon then out to the beach, was rebuilt in 1988 and extended in 1991. The full boardwalk was completed in 2007.  In November 2010, a further section of boardwalk was completed. This extension finishes at the mouth of the river and has taken the length of the boardwalk to almost . Hungry Head,  to the south is the only patrolled beach in Urunga.

On 8 December 2017, the Federal Court of Australia determined that the Gumbaynggirr People have native title rights and interests over an area of land and waters at Wenonah Head, near Urunga. This determination resolved the oldest native title claim in New South Wales.

Culture
Urunga celebrates Father's Day with a "Picnic in the Park" in September and a Flathead fishing comp in November.

Education
 Urunga Public School
 Stepping Stones preschool

Transport
Urunga railway station opened on the North Coast line in 1923 and continues to be served by country passenger trains.

Urunga Wetlands
In May 2017 the Urunga Wetlands were opened to the public. It features a wheelchair accessible 150-metre boardwalk and a 450-metre walking track surrounding the park. In the late 1960s and early 1970s the area was the site of a processing plant used for extracting the heavy metal antimony from its ore, stibnite. Antimony and other heavy metals leached into the surrounding melaleuca wetlands creating what was claimed to be "one of the most polluted natural environments in New South Wales." In 2015 a $10 million reclamation project began that involved treating over 36,000 tonnes of contaminated soils at the site and its storage in an onsite containment cell. Water quality of the wetlands has returned to acceptable levels and birds and other wildlife have started to return since completion of the project.

Gallery

References

External links
All inclusive free community website
VISITNSW.com - Urunga

Towns in New South Wales
Mid North Coast
Coastal towns in New South Wales
Bellingen Shire